The 1951 Pacific hurricane season ran through the summer and fall of 1951. Nine tropical systems were observed during the season.



Systems

Tropical Storm One

A tropical storm hit near Acapulco early in the season in May.

Hurricane Two

A hurricane hit near Acapulco early in the season in June.

Tropical Storm Three

Three came close to land.

Tropical Storm Four

Tropical Storm Four existed from July 5 to July 6.

Tropical Storm Five

Tropical Storm Five existed from August 3 to August 10.

Tropical Storm Six

On August 24, a tropical storm was first observed south of Mexico. It paralleled the coastline, and moved northward into Baja California on the 28th. It dissipated the next day, and caused moderate flooding in southern California.

Tropical Storm Seven

Tropical Storm Seven existed from September 11 to September 15.

Hurricane Eight

Hurricane Eight existed from September 23 to September 28.

Tropical Storm Nine

The final tropical cyclone of the season existed from November 27 to November 30.

Other system 
A warm-core kona storm transitioned into a tropical cyclone at 0000 UTC on March 21, west of the Necker Island. The system began traveling eastward, and later to the northeast on March 22. Then, it turned sharply southward towards Hawaii on the same day. The system turned southwest toward the Hawaiian Islands at 0600 UTC of March 25, making its first landfall near Hauula on Oahu at 1200 UTC that day. The system weakened below tropical storm intensity as it passed through the island of Oahu. By six hours later, the system left the island and continued southward. Then, the system slowed down and curved back north toward Oahu. The system made a second landfall on Oahu near Mākaha, just past 0000 UTC on March 28. Later, the system scrapped the northwestern coast of the island. It re-entered the Pacific six hours later and turned west. The system then sped up and made its last landfall near Kealia, just past 0000 UTC on March 29. The storm moved quickly across the island, and it left the island about six hours later. The JTWC stopped tracking the system east of the island of Nihoa eighteen hours later, after it had started to move across the Northwestern Hawaiian Islands.

The system has been considered a tropical or an extratropical cyclone. The JTWC and the American Meteorological Society (AMS) both consider the storm to be a tropical cyclone. However, the Regional Specialized Meteorological Centers for the eastern north Pacific, the National Hurricane Center (NHC) and Central Pacific Hurricane Center (CPHC) do not include the system in their archives. Due to this, the system was not considered tropical or subtropical officially. On March 25, tropical storm warnings were posted for the Hawaiian Islands. In Honolulu,  of rain was reported. The system contributed to the already above-average rainfall in the Hawaiian Islands. The rainfall amount for March 1951 was nearly 200 to 700 percent above normal. The rainfall set records for that month, but they were later broken in 2006.

See also

List of Pacific hurricanes
1951 Atlantic hurricane season
1951 Pacific typhoon season
 Australian region cyclone seasons: 1950–51 1951–52
 South Pacific cyclone seasons: 1950–51 1951–52
 South-West Indian Ocean cyclone seasons: 1950–51 1951–52

References